Lionel Cranfield Sackville, 1st Duke of Dorset  (18 January 168810 October 1765) was an English political leader and Lord Lieutenant of Ireland.

Life
He was the son of the 6th Earl of Dorset and 1st Earl of Middlesex, and the former Lady Mary Compton, younger daughter of the 3rd Earl of Northampton. Styled Lord Buckhurst from birth, he succeeded his father as 7th Earl of Dorset and 2nd Earl of Middlesex in 1706, and was created Duke of Dorset in 1720.

Perhaps because he had been on a previous diplomatic mission to Hanover, he was chosen to inform George I of his accession to the Crown in August 1714. George I initially favoured him and numerous offices and honours were given to him: Privy Councillor, Knight of the Garter, Groom of the Stole, Lord Steward, Governor of Dover Castle and Warden of the Cinque Ports. At George I's coronation he carried the sceptre: at the coronation of George II he was Lord High Steward and carried St Edward's Crown. He quarrelled with the King in 1717 and was told his services were no longer required, but was made a duke three years later.

Lord Lieutenant of Ireland

Dorset served twice as Lord Lieutenant of Ireland, from 1731 to 1737 and again from 1751 to 1755. In 1739, at the foundation of the Foundling Hospital, he was one of that charity's original governors. His first term as Lord Lieutenant was uneventful. His second took place at a time of acute political tension between the two main factions in the Irish Government, one led by Henry Boyle, the Speaker of the Irish House of Commons, the other by George Stone, the Anglican Archbishop of Armagh. Dorset, now heavily influenced by his son George Sackville, made the mistake of openly backing the Archbishop. He was unable to oust Boyle from power, and was accused of being the Archbishop's tool. He became extremely unpopular, leading to his eventual recall.

Last years
His last years were uneventful, apart from a riot in 1757 caused by the passage of the Militia Act to raise an army for the Seven Years' War, in which he narrowly escaped injury. He died at Knole on 9 October 1765 and was buried at Withyham in Sussex.

Character

Horace Walpole gave this sketch of his character: "with the greatest dignity in his appearance, he was in private the greatest lover of buffoonery and low company.... he was never thought to have wanted a tendency to power, in whatever hands it was, or was likely to be". Jonathan Swift thought him one of the most agreeable and well-informed men, and best conversationalists, he had ever met. Even harsh critics admitted his dignity and perfect decorum, a last legacy of the manners of the Court of Queen Anne.

Family
He married Elizabeth Colyear, the daughter of Lieutenant-General Walter Colyear (brother of the David Colyear, 1st Earl of Portmore), in January 1709. She later became a Lady of the Bedchamber (1714–1737) and Mistress of the Robes (1723–1731) to Caroline of Ansbach, wife of George II.

Lionel and Elizabeth's sons were:

Charles, Earl of Middlesex (later 2nd Duke of Dorset)
Lord John Sackville (father of John Sackville, 3rd Duke of Dorset)
Lord George Sackville (later Lord George Germain and 1st Viscount Sackville)

They also had two daughters:

Elizabeth, who married Thomas Thynne, 2nd Viscount Weymouth
 Caroline, who married Joseph Damer, 1st Earl of Dorchester.

References

|-

101
Knights of the Garter
Lord High Stewards
Lord-Lieutenants of Kent
Lord Presidents of the Council
Lords Lieutenant of Ireland
Lords Warden of the Cinque Ports
Members of the Privy Council of Great Britain
1688 births
1765 deaths
Lionel
Members of the Kit-Kat Club
Earls of Dorset
Grooms of the Stool
Court of George I of Great Britain